Swedish brand Craft of Scandinavia is a producer of functional sports apparel. The company is based in Borås, an old and traditional textile industry town in the South of Sweden. The initial concept of its founder Anders Bengtsson was to develop underwear that propels moisture away from the skin during physical activity. Craft started with technical base layers and soon developed the three-layer principle with a second layer of insulation and moisture transportation as well as an outer shell for protection. Today, the company offers gear for all kinds of sports focusing with layer three on running, triathlon, bike and cross-country skiing.

History 

In 1973, Swede Anders Bengtsson started developing a base layer material that transports moisture (sweat) away from the skin. Bengtsson tested his designs by weighing his gear after exercise sessions. He used polyester fibers, which only absorb a minimum amount of moisture, and worked them into a weaving construction. The resulting capillary action further promotes moisture expulsion transporting sweat from the skin to the outer surface of the garment where it quickly evaporates. The brand Craft of Sweden was officially founded in 1977. In addition to technical baselayers, the company soon started producing second layer garments (focused on fleece material) and outerwear.  In 2022, the company's product offering includes a wide range of functional underwear (for different levels of physical activity and different ambient temperatures), especially clothing for endurance athletes (cyclists, runners, track and field athletes, cross-country skiers, triathletes) and team sports.

Company takeovers 

New Wave Group acquired the brand in 1996.

Sponsorships
Craft is the official supplier and sponsor of numerous association football teams, players and associations, including:

Associations
 2016 ConIFA World Football Cup

Basket

Club teams
 Alliance Sport Alsace
 Limoges CSP (2020-)

Curling

National teams
  Switzerland

Football

Club teams

Europe
 Ordino
 Gent
 Helsingør 
 Frem 
  AC Oulu
 PS Kemi
 Toulouse  
 Darmstadt 98
 Almere City
 SC Cambuur  
 Zwolle
 Fredrikstad FK
 Hammarby
 IFK Göteborg 
 Trelleborgs FF 
 Varbergs BoIS 
 Luzern

Gymnastics

National teams
 Sweden  (since September 2020)

Handball

National teams
 (Men) (since July 2019)
 (Women) (since July 2019)

Club teams
Men
 Bordeaux Bruges Lormont Handball (since 2022–2023 season)
 Dunkerque Handball Grand Littoral
 Fenix Toulouse Handball
 Limoges Hand 87
 Massy Essonne Handball
 Saint-Raphaël Var Handball
 Strasbourg Eurométropole Handball	
 SC DHfK Leipzig Handball (since September 2020)
Women
 Odense Håndbold (since July 2019)
 Brest Bretagne Handball (since 2020)
 Mérignac Handball
 Atlantique Nantes (since  2020–2021 season)

Ski
  Sweden  (Men) (since January 2019)
  Sweden (Women) (since January 2019)

Swimming

National teams
  Faroe Islands  (since Jenuary 2020)
  Sweden  (since September 2021)

Volleyball

Club teams
 Volley Mulhouse Alsace (Asptt Mulhouse) (Women) (since August 2021 until 2025)
 M.O.Mougins Volleyball (Women) (since August 2021)
 DSC Volleyball Damen (Women) (since July 2019)

Track and field

National teams
  Denmark
  Finland
  Sweden

Other sports

The Craft athlete team includes several national teams, among them the Swedish National XC-Team, as well as individual athletes such as Marit Björgen, Charlotte Kalla, Rene Poulsen, and Kaisa Mäkäräinen

Craft also supplies specific apparel to the Orica–BikeExchange professional cycling team.

Sponsored events: Vasaloppet, Tour de Ski (presenting sponsor), Bike Trans Germany (title sponsor), Vätternrundan, Tjejmilen, and Stockholm Halvmarathon.

Critics

Craft is sometimes criticized for having its clothes produced in low-wage countries. This is where the production of fabrics and clothing takes place.

References

External links
 Official website
Alternative website

Clothing companies of Sweden
Sporting goods brands
Sporting goods manufacturers of Sweden
Sportswear brands
Swedish brands
Companies based in Västra Götaland County